Butlers is a settlement in the east of the island of Nevis in Saint Kitts and Nevis. It is located inland from the coast, to the north of Mannings and south of Brick Kiln.

Populated places in Saint Kitts and Nevis